The discontinued SPARClite RISC processor family was based on the 32-bit SPARC V8 architecture. It was manufactured in (approximately) the 1990s by Fujitsu, with the designation MB8683x. It was used in many embedded applications (including a number of early digital cameras). It was followed by the Fujitsu FR and FR-V processors.

See also
Nikon Expeed
Fujitsu Softune
ITRON project

References
 "Fujitsu Extends SparcLite Family". Microprocessor Report (20 June 1994).

SPARC microprocessors
Fujitsu microprocessors